The 1969–70 Scottish Inter-District Championship was a rugby union competition for Scotland's district teams.

This season saw the 17th Scottish Inter-District Championship.

South won the competition with 2 wins and 1 draw.

1969-70 League Table

Results

Round 1

Glasgow District: 

South:

Round 2

 Edinburgh District: 

North and Midlands:

Round 3

North and Midlands:

South:

Round 4

Glasgow District: 

Edinburgh District:

Round 5

Edinburgh District': 

'South:

Round 6

North and Midlands: 

Glasgow District:

References

1969–70 in Scottish rugby union
Scottish Inter-District Championship seasons